David Michael Dunne (born 30 November 1955) is an English former competitive swimmer

Swimming career
He represented Great Britain at the 1976 Summer Olympics in Montreal, Canada, where he won a bronze medal as a member of the third-place British team in the men's 4x200-metre freestyle relay.  At the 1978 Commonwealth Games in Edmonton, Alberta, Dunne won two more bronze medals as a member of the English teams in the 4x100-metre and 4x200-metre freestyle relay events. He also won the 1978 ASA National Championships over 200 metres freestyle.

Personal life
Dunne is now a site manager at a school in the borough of Eastleigh in Hampshire. His son, Aaron, is also a sportsman and drives a Peugeot.

See also
 List of Commonwealth Games medallists in swimming (men)
 List of Olympic medalists in swimming (men)

References

1955 births
Living people
English male freestyle swimmers
Olympic bronze medallists for Great Britain
Olympic bronze medalists in swimming
Olympic swimmers of Great Britain
Swimmers at the 1976 Summer Olympics
Medalists at the 1976 Summer Olympics
Commonwealth Games medallists in swimming
Commonwealth Games bronze medallists for England
Swimmers at the 1978 Commonwealth Games
Medallists at the 1978 Commonwealth Games